(The Moon) is an opera in one act by Carl Orff based on a Grimm's fairy tale with a libretto by the composer. It was first performed on 5 February 1939 by the Bavarian State Opera in Munich under the direction of Clemens Krauss. The composer describes it not as an opera but as Ein kleines Welttheater ("A little world theatre"); the performance lasts for about one hour and is often paired with Orff's Die Kluge.

Roles

Synopsis

The story involves characters who steal the moon for their country which does not have a moon. They take the moon to their graves upon their deaths and St. Peter goes to the underworld to retrieve it and hang it again in the sky. Two speaking roles include that of a child and a landlord. Singing roles include the four rascals who steal the moon, St. Peter, a farmer and the narrator.

Instrumentation
 Woodwind: 3 flutes (2 doubling piccolos), 3 oboes (1 doubling English horn), 3 clarinets (1 doubling bass clarinet), 2 bassoons (1 doubling double bassoon)
 Brass: 4 horns, 3 trumpets, 3 trombones, tuba
 Percussion (5 percussionists): bass drum, snare drum, field drum, tambourine, triangle, xylophone, cymbals, castanets, various Turkish cymbals, big tamtam, ratchet, stick, sleigh bells, hour bell, tubular bells, glass harmonica, metallophone, glockenspiel
 Other instruments: harp, celesta, piano, harmonium, accordion, zither, strings
 Stage orchestra: mixed choir, natural horn (tuba), organ, bells, 3 field drums, bass drum, cymbals, tam-tam, wind machine, thunder machine, thunder & lighting (Blitz, Einschlag)

Selected recordings
Die Kluge, Der Mond, conductor: Kurt Eichhorn, 1970, RCA Classic, 
Die Kluge, Der Mond, Elisabeth Schwarzkopf, Gottlob Frick, Marcel Cordes, Benno Kusche, Hermann Prey, Gustav Neidlinger, Hans Hotter, Karl Schmitt-Walter, conductor: Wolfgang Sawallisch, 1990, EMI Classics 0777763712 2 1

References

Carl Orff: Biography
Erik Levi. "Mond, Der." In The New Grove Dictionary of Opera, edited by Stanley Sadie. Grove Music Online. Oxford Music Online

External links
Text of Grimm's fairy tale 

Operas by Carl Orff
German-language operas
Operas
1939 operas
One-act operas